The 2015–16 Bundesliga was the 53rd season of the Bundesliga, Germany's premier football competition. The season started on 14 August 2015 and ended on 14 May 2016. Bayern Munich were the defending champions, after winning their 24th Bundesliga title and 25th German championship overall in the previous season.

Bayern Munich won the 2015–16 title in the second-last round on 7 May 2016, thereby becoming the first club in the history of the Bundesliga and the German football championship to win four consecutive championships.

Teams

A total of 18 teams were participating in this year's edition of the Bundesliga. Of these, 15 sides qualified directly from the 2014–15 season and the two sides were directly promoted from the 2014–15 2. Bundesliga season: FC Ingolstadt, the champions, and Darmstadt 98, the runners-up. The final participant was decided by a two-legged play-off, in which the 16th-placed Bundesliga club, Hamburger SV, defeated the third-place finisher in the 2. Bundesliga, Karlsruher SC.

Stadiums and locations

Personnel and kits

Managerial changes

League table

Results

Relegation play-offs
The team which finished 16th faced the third-placed 2015–16 2. Bundesliga side for a two-legged play-off. The winner on aggregate score after both matches will earn entry into the 2016–17 Bundesliga.

First leg

Second leg

Eintracht Frankfurt won 2–1 on aggregate.

Season statistics

Top goalscorers

Hat-tricks

5 Player scored five goals

Awards

Player of the Month

Number of teams by state

References

External links

Bundesliga seasons
1
Germany